The Georgina River is the north-westernmost of the three major rivers of the Channel Country in Central West Queensland, that also flows through a portion of the Northern Territory, in central Australia. Part of the Lake Eyre basin, the Georgina flows in extremely wet years into Lake Eyre.

The river is named in honour of Georgina Mildred Kennedy, the daughter of Queensland governor Arthur Kennedy. The river was originally called the Herbert River before being given its current name in 1890 to avoid confusion with the other river in Queensland that bears that name.

Geography
With its headwaters rising in the Barkly Tableland, north of Camooweal in Queensland, and in the extreme east of the Northern Territory beyond Tennant Creek and to the south draining the northern slopes of the Macdonnell Ranges, the Georgina is formed from several smaller streams over a wide area of north-western Queensland and the eastern Northern Territory. From source to mouth, the Georgina is joined by more than 35 tributaries including the Buckley, Templeton, Burke, Hamilton, Herbert, Ranken, and Sandover rivers; and flows through 26 billabongs. As the Georgina flows south into the Channel Country, it reaches it confluence with Eyre Creek that, in times of peak flow, empties into the Warburton River and ultimately into Lake Eyre.

Although a small part of the Macdonnell Ranges drains into the Georgina, most of the catchment is a flat as the Diamantina, though low ranges are very prominent in the north-west of the basin. This western part of the basin has soils that are too infertile to provide nutritious fodder for cattle or sheep and a large proportion is an Aboriginal reserve. The eastern part of the Georgina catchment near Boulia is very similar to the Diamantina and Cooper basins, being grassy plains with heavy cracking clay soils that are quite fertile and provide very good feed in wet years for livestock. The Lake Machattie Area is an important breeding site for waterbirds.

Climate

Almost all of this rain falls in the summer, and it is quite normal for the period from May to September to not record any measurable falls at all.

Flooding

Inundation can last for months at a time, which can disrupt road and rail transport in the area. The highest recorded flood occurred in January 1974.

The Georgina River and the Diamatina Rivers both were flooded and the Sandringham station was submerged.

The lower reaches flooded in 1950 and again in 1953 following heavy rain events further north. The 1953 flood was  higher at Glengyle Station compared to the 1950 event. The Diamantina River was also in flood and the waters were expected to make it to Lake Eyre.

Moderate flooding was experienced along the river, including Glenormiston Station, in 2010 following heavy rains locally and further north in the Georgina catchment.

Although it is the driest of the three main rivers of the Lake Eyre Basin, there is evidence that the Georgina has, in the past, actually reached the lake more frequently than either the Diamantina or Cooper. Some wave built shingle terraces suggest that during the Medieval Warm Period Lake Eyre held permanent water. Large increases since the late 1960s in rainfall over the Northern Territory and pastoral areas of South and Western Australia that have not been duplicated over Queensland do suggest an enhanced greenhouse effect in the Medieval Warm Period may have caused the Georgina to regularly fill Lake Eyre. However, far too little evidence exists for any certainty of this.

Georgina River Bridge at Camooweal 

Given the economic importance of transport on the Barkly Highway (the only sealed road between Queensland and the Northern Territory), a longstanding problem was the flooding of the Georgina River immediately west of Camooweal in Queensland. As the water levels in the Georgina River vary enormously from being completely dry to flooding, the Barkly Highway bridge over the Georgina River was often unusable for many days due to flooding, with road trains and other heavy vehicles having to wait weeks before it was safe to cross. To alleviate these problems, the Georgina River Bridge was officially opened on 20 December 2002 by Senator Ron Boswell and Steve Breadhauer, Minister for Transport in the Queensland Government. The bridge uses an unusual arch design to avoid placing pylons into the river bed which is culturally significant to the local Dugalunji people, who call the new bridge Ilaga Thuwani meaning The Camping Ground of the Rainbow Serpent.

See also

References

Rivers of Queensland
Rivers of the Northern Territory
North West Queensland
Lake Eyre basin
Shire of Boulia